The 1954 Bavarian state election was held on 28 November 1954 to elect the members of the Third Bavarian Landtag. It is notable for being both the only time that a member of the SPD was elected as Minister-President, and the only time that the CSU was in the opposition.

Background
In the previous 1950 election, the CSU had suffered a major blow, losing 40 of their seats within the Landtag. After strenuous negotiations that lasted 17 days, a broad coalition was formed between the CSU, SPD, and GB/BHE, with Hans Ehard retaining in his position as Minister-President. With a vote of 131-5, with 36 abstentions he was elected as Minister-President within the Landtag.

Auerbach Affair
The second Ehard term did not go without scandals, however. In 1946, Holocaust survivor Philipp Auerbach had been appointed as state commissioner of reparations. His tasks were many, but there was a particular focus on managing the repatriation of and administering reparations checks to those in displacement camps. Auerbach was described as having "acquired the funds for reparations payments in marginally legal, brilliant, and unorthodox ways," however this wasn't enough. The Bavarian government did not pay the full amount for reparation claims above $600. Instead, claimants received a first installment in cash, and a second in the form of compensations checks that couldn't be renewed until 1 January 1954. Displaced persons, who were often desperate for money, would sell these notes to for 30 to 50 percent of their face values to banks. The banks by 1950 had bought up about $2 million dollars worth of these notes. Minister-President Ehard gave approval for such transactions.

Auerbach eventually lodged a complaint to the state Justice Ministry in December 1950 that residency permits were being counterfeited for money, which blocked the way of actual claimants from receiving funds. Justice Minister Josef Müller however, turned this on its head and blamed Auerbach for such behaviors. On 27 January 1951, the Bavarian police occupied the state reparations office in Munich in search of evidence of fraud and mishandling on the part of Auerbach. While his methods (which included state-backed loans secured by Nazi property) were unorthodox, they weren't illegal, and there was no evidence of him personally enriching himself. However after a 17-month investigation, a four-month trial was launched (with several figures on the government's side being ex-Nazis, including the judge, Josef Mulzer, who had been on the Supreme Military Court for the Third Reich), which found him guilty and sentenced for two and a half years in prison. In the proceedings it was also discovered he falsely claimed the title of doctor, and had been a member of the Sicherheitsdienst. Auerbach took his own life in prison on 14 August 1952.

Results
While the Auerbach Affair hung over much of Ehard's tenure, none of the intrigue of the first term occurred, and the coalition stayed intact. The only immediate result was the forced resignation of the Justice Minister in 1952. The CSU managed to recoup some of their 1950 losses, gaining 19 seats in the 1954 elections, at the primary expense of the BP and GB/BHE which had divided the right-wing vote in 1950. However, an unlikely coalition formed. Under the leadership of the state SPD chair, Waldemar von Knoeringen, the SPD brokered a Viererkoalition (coalition-of-four) between themselves, the FDP, the BP, and GB/BHE  which stemmed from a collective skepticism of the CSU. On 14 December 1954 Wilhelm Hoegner was voted in as Minister-President. In light of this, disputes broke out within the CSU, which led to the resignation of Hans Ehard as party chair in January 1955, but he still retained his position as President of the Landtag.

Aftermath
The Hoegner government fell into a major scandal of its own, but it did not manage to come out intact like Ehard's had. In 1951, businessman Karl Freisehner had approached the government about casino operating concessions in his name. While this was rejected, several Landtag members had received a bribe of 50,000 marks in order to vote yes. With enough pressure, the Bavarian government did give the licences in April 1955. Soon afterwards, the CSU had launched a parliamentary investigation into the opening of the casinos. One of the recipients of the 50,000 mark check was a CSU deputy,  Franz Michel, who came forwards to his other party members. Later on he'd claim he burned the check. The crusade against the bribery was now led by Friedrich Zimmermann, who reportedly had incriminating evidence on the Deputy Minister-President and co-founder of the BP, Joseph Baumgartner.  In 1957, Baumgartner and Minister of the Interior August Geislhöringer (also a member of the BP) resigned in face of these allegations, and the coalition collapsed. This wasn't enough for Zimmerman and he eventually got what he wanted: in January 1959 Freisehner came forward with documents detailing payments made to the two ministers. Both were sentenced to jail, with Baumgartner receiving two years in prison, and Geislhöringer one and a half. It would later be revealed that the documents Freisehner had presented were most likely forged, however by that point it didn't matter, the BP had managed to destroy its own reputation.

The Viererkoalition officially collapsed on 8 October 1957. due to a combination of the Casino Affair, and the CDU/CSU victory in the 1957 federal election. The right-wing parties abandoned the SPD in reaction to the election, and Hoegner submitted his resignation on 9 October 1957. CSU politician Hanns Seidel was chosen as Minister-President, and formed a coalition with the FDP and GB/BHE, which would last through the 1958 state elections.

Parties
The table below lists parties represented in the Second Landtag of Bavaria.

|-
! colspan="2" | Party
! Votes
! %
! +/-
! Seats 
! +/-
! Seats %
|-
| bgcolor=| 
| align=left | Christian Social Union (CSU)
| align=right| 3,691,954	
| align=right| 38
| align=right|  10.6
| align=right| 83
| align=right|  19
| align=right| 40.7
|-
| bgcolor=| 
| align=left | Social Democratic Party (SPD)
| align=right| 2,733,946	
| align=right| 28.1
| align=right|  0.1
| align=right| 61
| align=right|  2
| align=right| 29.9
|-
| bgcolor= | 
| align=left | Bavaria Party
| align=right| 1,286,937
| align=right| 13.2
| align=right|  4.7
| align=right| 28
| align=right|  11
| align=right| 13.7
|-
| bgcolor=| 
| align=left | All-German Bloc/League of Expellees and Deprived of Rights (GB/BHE)
| align=right| 990,109	
| align=right| 10.2
| align=right|  2.1
| align=right| 19
| align=right|  7
| align=right| 9.3
|-
| bgcolor=| 
| align=left | Free Democratic Party (FDP)
| align=right| 653,741
| align=right| 7.1
| align=right|  1.4
| align=right| 13
| align=right|  1
| align=right| 6.4
|-
! colspan=8|
|-
| bgcolor=| 
| align=left | Communist Party (KPD)
| align=right| 205,206
| align=right| 2.1
| align=right|  0.2
| align=right| 0
| align=right| ±0
| align=right| 0
|-
|
| align=left | Others
| align=right| 111,652
| align=right| 1.2
| align=right| 
| align=right| 0
| align=right| ±0
| align=right| 0
|-
! align=right colspan=2| Total
! align=right| 9,673,545
! align=right| 100.0
! align=right| 
! align=right| 204
! align=right| 
! align=right|  
|-
! align=right colspan=2| Voter turnout
! align=right| 
! align=right| 82.4
! align=right|  2.5
! align=right| 
! align=right| 
! align=right|
|-
|colspan=8 align=left|Source: Statistik Bayern and Historisches Lexikon Bayerns 
|}
|}

References

External links
 Historisches Lexikon Bayerns
 House of Bavarian Elections 
 Election Results 1946-2018

Bavaria
Bavaria